The sport of association football in the country of Dominica is run by the Dominica Football Association. The association administers the national football team, as well as the Dominica Championship. Football is the most popular sport in Dominica.

National football stadium

References